The 2003–04 Slovenian Third League was the 12th season of the Slovenian Third League, the third highest level in the Slovenian football system.

Factor Ježica defeated Korte in a promotion play-offs (0–4, 4–0, 4–1 (pen.)).
Šoštanj defeated Nafta Lendava in a promotion play-offs (2–0, 0–0), but they did not get the competition licence for the 2.SNL, so Nafta took their place.

League standings

Centre

East

North

West

See also
2003–04 Slovenian Second League

References

External links
Football Association of Slovenia 

Slovenian Third League seasons
3
Slovenia